Kevin Barrett may refer to:

 Kevin Barrett (rugby union) (born 1980), English rugby union player
 Kevin Barrett (footballer) (1915–1984), Australian rules footballer
 Kevin Barrett (game designer), role-playing game designer
 Kevin Barrett (cricketer) (born 1975), Welsh cricketer